Børge Josefsen (born 24 September 1953) is a Norwegian footballer. He played in one match for the Norway national football team in 1975.

References

External links
 

1953 births
Living people
Norwegian footballers
Norway international footballers
Place of birth missing (living people)
Association footballers not categorized by position